Adrienne McQueen (1983)  is a German-American actress.

Early life
Her mother is the German painter Marion Jansen-Baisch. She grew up in Europe, in England, Austria, Italy, and Germany. She won the European Musical Voice Award of the year for Austria. Which is the Austrian equivalent to American idol. She has recorded and performed original music but also cover songs all over the world.

McQueen started her career, training as a classical ballet dancer at the Royal Academy of Dance in London. Her education in art led her to her first acting job on stage at the English Theaters in Frankfurt, Berlin and Vienna. To get a solid training in acting she enrolled at the Stella Adler Academy of Acting in Los Angeles.

Traveling between Europe and America she landed various roles in TV movies, co-starring next to Dean Cain and David Keith amongst others.

Attending the Cannes Film Festival she was discovered by German director Uwe Boll to act in his film BloodRayne alongside Michael Madsen, Michelle Rodriguez, Ben Kingsley, and Meat Loaf.

She also starred in the horror film Brotherhood of Blood directed by Michael Roesch and Peter Scherer and was directed by Joaquin Phoenix in a music video for the band Ringside.

She is also a screenwriter and creative producer for feature films.

References

External links

German film actresses
Living people
1983 births